Asia Corporation Dialogue Summit also known as ACD Summit is one of the main summits attained by leaders of Asia. Summit began in 2001 as a ministerial-level summit, but in 2014 summit converted to a head of state level. Inaugurated in June 2002 in Cha-Am, Thailand, with 34 founding member nations.

List of meetings

References

21st-century diplomatic conferences (Asia-Pacific)